Saint-Jacques River is a river in southwestern Quebec, Canada that drains the Saint Lawrence Lowlands.  It flows in a general south to north direction, from the area around Saint-Jacques-le-Mineur (in Les Jardins-de-Napierville) to its mouth in the Saint Lawrence River, at the border between the cities of Brossard and La Prairie.

Geography

The Saint-Jacques River meanders through the agricultural and forested lowlands of the Montérégie region near the Saint Lawrence River.  As a result, it flows through and drains areas of sparse and dense population like agricultural towns and suburban cities on the south shore of the Island of Montreal.

The main hydrographic slopes near the Saint-Jacques River are:
 north side: Prairie Creek;
 east side: Acadia River, Lécuyer watercourse;
 south side: Saint-André Creek, Acadia River;
 west side: St. Lawrence Seaway, St. Lawrence River. The Saint-Jacques River has its source of a set of agricultural streams draining the area south of the municipality of Saint-Jacques-le-Mineur, Quebec and west of the watershed with the slope hydrographic survey of the Acadia River.

Course from the head (26.1 km, 16-mile segment)

In this first segment, it passes in the rank Saint-Philippe-Nord and Saint-Marc. Then, the river flows on the northwest to the village of Saint-Philippe-de-Laprairie which it crosses in serpentine fashion. From this village, the river flows northwest ( serpentine to the mouth of Saint-André Creek (coming from the southwest).

Course downstream of Autoroute 10 (segment of )

Then the river flows northwest ( past the Brossard, Quebec Illinois Park and serpentine to route 134, which is Taschereau Boulevard. This last segment of the river passes east of Parc Émilie-Gamelin in La Prairie, Quebec and collects the waters of Saint-Claude stream (coming from the east) whose main tributaries are the "ruisseau des Bois" and the "Battle Creek". In this last segment, the Saint-Jacques River runs westward across a golf course and serving more or less of a boundary between the cities of Brossard, Quebec and La Prairie, Quebec.

Meandering course
A common characteristic of rivers, such as this one, that flow through sedimentary soil of lowlands is the formation of bends and oxbow lakes along its course.  This meandering course is due to the erosion of the soil.  One notable oxbow lake along this river is located in the territory of Brossard, forming an island (at )..

Regional Park of the Saint-Jacques River 

The creation of the Saint-Jacques Regional Park is sponsored by the Ville-Marie Priority Intervention Area Committee (ZIP). The area between Taschereau Boulevard and Autoroute 30 includes public lands whose transfers to cities are yet to be completed. In the long term, this regional park project aims to encompass the Boisé de Brossard (largely composed of private land) and the "Boisé de la Commune" in La Prairie (entirely composed of private land).

From the seaway, this river is navigable by canoe and kayak to the east of Autoroute 30. This watercourse, which delimits the towns of Brossard and La Prairie, Quebec, is surrounded by former farmland. Its banks, which are generally bare of trees, include turtles and water birds such as ducks and herons. Hypothetically, this area could be transformed into a regional park encompassing the surrounding woodlands; this park could cover a larger area than the Mont-Saint-Bruno National Park. The river is accessible via Radisson Park where visitors can rent river boats.

In December 2014, the City of Brossard acquired for a million dollars a strip of 50-meter (55-yard) wide riparian lands covering 9830 square meters (2½ acres), between Radisson Park and Taschereau Boulevard, with the objective of protecting this waterfront.

History

Early 17th century

The Saint-Jacques River was first described by Samuel de Champlain in his notes on his 1611 voyage along the Saint Lawrence River and in the area around La Place Royale on the Island of Montreal:

References

See also 
 Roussillon Regional County Municipality
 Saint Lawrence river, un cours d'eau
 St. Lawrence Seaway
 Brossard, a city
 La Prairie, a city
 List of rivers of Quebec

Brossard
Rivers of Montérégie
La Prairie, Quebec
Tributaries of the Saint Lawrence River
Les Jardins-de-Napierville Regional County Municipality